Peartree railway station is a railway station serving the areas of Pear Tree, Normanton and Osmaston in the city of Derby, England. It is one of three stations remaining open in the city (the others being the main Derby station and Spondon), and is situated about one mile south of Derby station on the main line to Birmingham. For a short period Derby - Birmingham local services called at Peartree, but it is now served  by two trains each way on Mondays to Saturdays on the Crewe to Derby Line, a community rail line also known as the North Staffordshire line. The station is owned by Network Rail and managed by East Midlands Railway.

History 
Originally called Pear Tree and Normanton it opened on 2 June 1890.  The opening of the station opened up the area between it and Normanton Barracks for development. The plots of 333 sq yards were advertised as suitable for workmen's dwellings or small villas. The initial service provided by the Midland Railway was 11 trains each day to and from Derby. 

A branch line to Melbourne diverged from the main line at Melbourne Junction immediately south of the station. This branch had been wholly closed to passenger traffic by 1930, and the diminished importance of Pear Tree and Normanton station as a result contributed to its closure on 4 March 1968.

On 4 October 1976, the branch line was partially reopened as far as Sinfin in order to transport workers to and from the Rolls-Royce plant there. As a result, the newly renamed Peartree station (note alternative spelling) was once again in use. Whereas Sinfin North was within Rolls-Royce property and hence accessible only to employees, Peartree and Sinfin Central had public access. Although the Sinfin branch was closed to passengers in 1998, Peartee has remained open as a result of its location on the main line. As a small suburban halt, main line services rarely stop here and the station is little used by passengers.

Stationmasters

W. Williams 1890 - 1894  (formerly station master at Cray, afterwards station master at Bamford)
George Harvey 1894 - 1902 
J.W. Peach 1902 - 1905 (afterwards station master at Denby)
Thomas George William Groves 1905 - 1908 (afterwards station master at Peartree and Normanton)
Samuel Souter 1908 - 1912
Sidney W. Varnam 1912 - 1914 (formerly station master at Barrow upon Soar, afterwards station master at Trowell)
W.F. Gardner from 1914
Joshua Lomas 1920 - 1946

Facilities 
Access to the platforms is from Osmaston Park Road (part of the A5111 Derby ring road), which crosses the line immediately to the south of the station via locked gates which are opened for passengers who use the provided intercom. There are no station buildings or shelter, and the entrances were badly overgrown. In January 2007, the station was without signage denoting the location and the platforms were in an exceedingly poor state of repair, but by April 2009 it had been refurbished with new lighting and new signs installed. As the station is unstaffed and with no ticket vending machines, passengers must purchase the ticket on board; the full range of tickets for travel are purchased from the guard on the train at no extra cost.

Services
All services at Peartree are operated by East Midlands Railway.

There is no Sunday service at the station.

CrossCountry services between Derby and  pass through the station but do not stop.

References

Further reading

External links

Railway stations in Derby
DfT Category F2 stations
Former Midland Railway stations
Railway stations in Great Britain opened in 1890
Railway stations in Great Britain closed in 1968
Railway stations in Great Britain opened in 1976
Reopened railway stations in Great Britain
Railway stations served by East Midlands Railway
Beeching closures in England